The Basement is a television play (later a stage play) by Harold Pinter.  It was written first as a screenplay for a film, then revised for television and broadcast on 20 February 1967.

Origin: "The Compartment"
The Basement is based on "The Compartment" (1965), an unpublished 27-page screenplay (circulated only in typescript) that Pinter wrote in 1963–65 "for a film never made, planned as part of  a triple-bill, Project I promoted by Grove Press, New York, with Samuel Beckett's Film [1965] and Eugène Ionesco's The Hard-Boiled Egg" (Baker and Ross 112).  Of the three works planned for this trilogy of films, "only Film would be produced, being released in 1965" (112).

According to Pinter's official authorised biographer Michael Billington, also cited by Baker and Ross (112), "Pinter's contribution The Compartment lay dormant until he rewrote it for television as The Basement" (Billington 191).

Setting

The "exterior" and "interior" of "a basement flat" in various seasons and at various times of day and night (Two Plays and a Film Script 91–112).

Synopsis

Two men, (Tim) Law and (Charles) Stott, compete for possession of and dominance over a "basement flat" and their at-times mutual girlfriend, Jane.  During the course of the play, they reverse roles with relation to each other, to the ownership or possession of the flat, and to their relationship with or possession of Jane. The changing furnishings of the room reflect their changing roles and who is in power over whom at various points in time.  At first Jane appears to be submissive in relation to the men; but as the action develops, at times she appears to dominate each man and both of them.  The character relationships between Stott and Law and the basic plot resemble Pinter's prose fiction works "Kullus" and "The Examination".

Characters
Law, "a man"
Stott, "a man"
Jane, "a girl"

Productions

Television première
First transmitted on 20 February 1967, it formed part of BBC 2's Theatre 625 series.

Director
Charles Jarrott
Cast
Derek Godfrey, Law
Harold Pinter, Stott
Kika Markham, Jane

Stage première: Eastside Playhouse, New York, October 1968
The Basement was first produced on stage at the Eastside Playhouse, in New York City, in October 1968, as part of a double bill with Pinter's play Tea Party, directed by James Hammerstein.
Cast
Ted van Griethuysen, Law
James Ray Jane, Stott
Margo Ann Berdeshevsky, Jane

Stage personnel
Ed Wittstein, Scenery
Neil Peter Jampolis, Lighting
Deidre Cartier, Costumes

Duchess Theatre, London, September 1970 
Hammerstein also directed another stage production at the Duchess Theatre, in London, on 17 September 1970 (The Basement, HaroldPinter.org) with a new cast.

Cast
Donald Pleasence, Law
Barry Foster, Stott
Stephanie Beacham, Jane

See also

Characteristics of Harold Pinter's work

Notes

Works cited

Baker, William, and John C. Ross, comps.  Harold Pinter: A Bibliographical History.  London: The British Library (BL); New Castle, DE: Oak Knoll Press (OKP), 2005.   (BL).   (OKP).

Billington, Michael.  Harold Pinter.  1996.  London: Faber and Faber, 2007.

Pinter, Harold. The Basement.  In Plays: Three.  London: Eyre Methuen, 1978.  .

–––.  The Lover, Tea Party, The Basement: Two Plays and a Film Script.  New York: Grove Press, 1967. (An Evergreen Book E-432).

–––.  Tea Party and Other Plays.  London: Methuen, 1967.  British first ed.; published 15 June 1967. (Baker and Ross 54–55).

External links
The Basement at HaroldPinter.org – The Official Website of the International Playwright Harold Pinter

1967 television plays
Plays by Harold Pinter
Films with screenplays by Harold Pinter